Schefflera bractescens is a species of plant in the family Araliaceae. It is native to New Guinea and far northern Australia. Originally named from a New Guinea collection, it was identified as a different species, Schefflera versteegii, when first discovered in Australia.

References

bractescens
Apiales of Australia
Least concern flora of Australia
Nature Conservation Act rare biota
Least concern biota of Queensland
Rare flora of Australia
Flora of Queensland
Taxonomy articles created by Polbot